The twelfth season of the American competitive television series BattleBots premiered on Discovery Channel on January 5, 2023. This is the fifth main-line season of Battlebots to premiere on Discovery Channel and the seventh main-line season since the show was rebooted in 2015; official material markets this season as World Championship VII.

Returning for the 12 season as hosts and analysts are MLB/NFL Sportscaster Chris Rose and former UFC fighter Kenny Florian, as well as BattleBox announcer Faruq Tauheed.

The "Upper Deck" and its spinning saw blades is now a main staple in the ever-evolving BattleBox. This season each team will face four guaranteed fights in the qualifying matches that lead up to the semifinals and to the seventh world championship tournament. Also new for this season, fans can go to BattleBots website to see every bots complete schedule. No more waiting to find out what team is fighting and when. 

Brand new this season in the arena are special champion banners hanging up over the entranceway. They represent the legendary bots that "reached the pinnacle" of the sport of robot-combat by winning the Giant Nut trophy. The banners feature a picture of the champion bot with the competition that they won with a Roman numeral. Last season's champion bot,  Tantrum was the first team to witness their own banner raising before their match began.

Judges
The 11-point scale system returned where the judges award 5 points for damage; 3 points for aggression; and 3 points for control.

The current judges are: former BattleBots contenders, Derek Young, Lisa Winter, and returning to the panel from hiatus, Fon Davis.

Contestants
This season marked the 23rd year of the BattleBots competition. The lineup features 56 of the best heavyweight robots to fight head-to-head in the Battle Arena.

Every team will fight four times in the qualifying rounds. Their goal is to earn a spot in the top 32 in the winner-take-all championship tournament and ultimately become the 2022 BattleBots World Champion. Teams will have one appeal if won can use it one more time.

Episodes

References

BattleBots